Danilović is a Serbian surname, meaning "the son of Danilo".

People with this name
Branislav Danilović (born 1988), football goalkeeper
Damian Danilović (born 1984), World Champion ballroom dancer 
Goran Danilović, Serbian politician in Montenegro
Olga Danilović (born 2001), Serbian tennis player
Predrag Danilović (born 1970), Serbian basketball player
Rajko Danilović, Serbian lawyer
Uglješa Danilović (born 1913), KPJ activist, Partisan with a People's Hero gallantry medal, and Yugoslav provincial and federal functionary of Serbian ethnicity
Vladimir "Vlada" Danilović (1841-1876), Serbian Army second lieutenant in the 1876-1878 Serbo-Turkish War
Vojislav Danilović (1910-1981), Serbian allergologist and Academician
Lazar Danilović (born 1992), Sergeant in the Royal Netherlands Army

See also
Danilowicz

Serbian surnames
Patronymic surnames
Surnames from given names